Crucible is a census-designated place and coal town in Greene County, Pennsylvania, United States. Their post office opened in 1914. The 2010 census reported Crucible with a population of 725. 70.6% of households are families, with an average family size of 3.02.

History 
At its peak in 1953, the mine employed 903 people. Over the course of its operation, the mine produced 36.5 million tons of coal. The mine closed in 1961.

The community of Crucible had its own school, which operated under the umbrella of the Carmichaels Area School District, until the 1991-1992 school year, when the new elementary school in Carmichaels opened. The school has subsequently been shut down, but had been used as a haunted house for fundraisers and as a training facility for the local volunteer fire department; it has been demolished.

Geography
Crucible is located in northeastern Greene County, in the northern part of Cumberland Township, on the south side of the Monongahela River. The CDP begins at the riverbank and extends south up the  river bluff to a plateau where most of the houses are located.

Demographics

Today 
There are multiple types of homes in the "patch", including one-story single family homes, two-story single family homes, and two-story multiple family homes, or duplexes. Some, if not many, of the homes were built around 1913, when the mine opened. The 2010 census reports that there were 315 housing units at the time of the survey.

The Department of Health currently classifies Crucible, as well as some of the surrounding areas in Greene County, as a medically underserved area. The Census Bureau's 2011-2015 American Community Survey 5-Year estimates show an unemployment rate of 16.9%. It also reports an average household income of $44,884, but a per capita income of only $14,577. 30.7% of families have had their incomes below the federal poverty level in the past 12 months, and 44.6% of families have received SNAP/food stamp benefits in the past 12 months.

The community currently has a post office, a playground, and two citizen's clubs. The community has a very active volunteer fire department, that holds bingo weekly, fish fries during Lent, and other events throughout the year.

There are two churches in Crucible, St. Mary's Catholic Church, and the New Apostolic Church, although there are multiple churches nearby, including Greene Valley Church of God and Hewitt Presbyterian Church. There are no stores in Crucible, but residents can travel to nearby Dry Tavern or Carmichaels for grocery stores and pharmacies. There are no restaurants in Crucible, but the Crucible Citizens Club and the Slovak Club offer members a place to grab a drink and a bite to eat.

Notable person
Frank Filchock, American and Canadian football player and coach.

External links
Coal Camp USA's Crucible page

References

Census-designated places in Pennsylvania
Census-designated places in Greene County, Pennsylvania
Coal towns in Pennsylvania
Pennsylvania populated places on the Monongahela River